Jermaine Omar Taylor (born 14 January 1985) is a Jamaican professional footballer.

Club career

Jamaica
Born in Portland, Jamaica, Taylor started his senior career as a first team regular by the age of 19.  While at Harbour View, Taylor won the CFU Club Championship and the National Premier League. In 2009, Taylor moved to Portland to play along with his brother Ricardo Taylor for St. George's SC.

United States

Houston Dynamo
In February 2011 it was reported that Taylor would be joining Houston Dynamo in Major League Soccer with the American club paying a transfer fee to St. George's SC. The American club had scouted Taylor during the 2010 Digicel Caribbean Cup. Taylor signed with Houston on 16 February 2011.

Portland Timbers
After the 2015 MLS season the Houston Dynamo did not pick up Taylor's option, making him eligible for the 2015 MLS Re-Entry Draft. In the second stage he was selected by the Portland Timbers with the 20th pick. On 22 January 2016, Taylor signed with the Portland Timbers.

Minnesota United FC
It was announced on 24 January 2017, that Minnesota United FC had signed Taylor as the team began its first season in Major League Soccer. His option was not renewed at the end of the 2017 season.

Austin Bold FC
On 23 January 2019, Taylor joined USL Championship side Austin Bold ahead of their inaugural season.

International career
Taylor has been capped at U-17, U-20, U-23 and national level for Jamaica. He made his debut for the senior side in 2004 and has been a regular since.

Along with team mates Andre Blake and Kemar Lawrence he was named in the Gold Cup Tournament Best XI in 2017. Jamaica played USMNT in the final, losing 2–1.

In late 2017, he was included in a Sports Illustrated list of active players with 100 or more international caps. However, the Jamaica Football Federation recorded only 99 matches.

Honours
Jamaica
 Caribbean Cup: 2005, 2010, 2014

Harbour View
 Jamaica National Premier League: 2017
 CFU Club Championship: 2004

Houston Dynamo
 Major League Soccer Eastern Conference Championship: 2011, 2012

Individual
 CONCACAF Gold Cup Best XI: 2017

See also
List of men's footballers with 100 or more international caps

References

External links
 
 

1985 births
Austin Bold FC players
Living people
Jamaican footballers
Jamaican expatriate footballers
Jamaica youth international footballers
Jamaica international footballers
Association football defenders
People from Portland Parish
Harbour View F.C. players
Houston Dynamo FC players
Portland Timbers players
Minnesota United FC players
2011 CONCACAF Gold Cup players
2014 Caribbean Cup players
2015 Copa América players
2015 CONCACAF Gold Cup players
Copa América Centenario players
2017 CONCACAF Gold Cup players
Expatriate soccer players in the United States
Major League Soccer players
National Premier League players
USL Championship players
FIFA Century Club